James Muirhead (1925–1999) was an Australian judge.

James Muirhead may also refer to:

James Fullarton Muirhead (1853–1934), Scottish writer of travel guides
James Muirhead (swimmer) (born 1953), British Paralympian
James Muirhead (cricketer) (born 1993), Australian cricketer
James Patrick Muirhead (1813–1898), Scottish advocate and author
James Muirhead (scholar) (1830–1899), professor of civil law at Edinburgh University